Alkali Flat/La Valentina station is an at-grade light rail station on the Blue Line of the Sacramento RT Light Rail system operated by the Sacramento Regional Transit District. The station is located alongside 12th Street at its intersection with D Street, in the Alkali Flat Historic District, after which the station is named, in the city of Sacramento, California.

References 

Sacramento Regional Transit light rail stations
Railway stations in the United States opened in 1987